The 1968–69 Ranji Trophy was the 35th season of the Ranji Trophy. Bombay retained the title defeating Bengal in the final.

Highlights
M. V. Nagendra was an umpire in the final between Bombay and Bengal, emulating his father M. G. Vijayasarathi who stood in the 1940-41 final.

Group stage

North Zone

West Zone

East Zone

South Zone

Central Zone

Knockout stage

Final

Scorecards and averages
Cricketarchive

References

External links

1969 in Indian cricket
Domestic cricket competitions in 1968–69
Ranji Trophy seasons